Life's Good is a Hindi-language Indian drama film produced by Anand Shukla under his banner EktAnand Pictures, and directed by Anant Mahadevan. The film stars Jackie Shroff, Rajit Kapur, Mohan Kapoor, Anannaya Vij, Saniya Anklesaria, and Ankita Shrivastav, with Sunita Sen Gupta, Nakul Sahdev, and Saanand Verma appearing in supporting roles. The story is inspired by the personal diary of screenwriter Sujit Sen, documenting his stay in a Mumbai hospital. The film was originally scheduled to be released on 10 August 2018 but delays caused it to be pushed back; a new release date has been scheduled for 9 December 2022.

Soundtrack
The film's soundtrack is composed by Abhishek Ray. Lyrics are written by Manvendra and Nivedita Joshi.

Cast
 Jackie Shroff
 Ananya vij
 Saniya Anklesaria
 Nakul sahdev
 Rajit Kapur
 Darshan Jariwala
 Mohan Kapoor
 Sunita Sen Gupta
 Saanand Verma

References

External links
 

Indian drama films
Films directed by Anant Mahadevan
2022 drama films
2020s Hindi-language films
Hindi-language drama films